John W. Groves (1844–1921) was Mayor of Madison, Wisconsin. He held the office from 1902 to 1903.

References

Mayors of Madison, Wisconsin
1844 births
1921 deaths